St. Lawrence's Church is a historic, wooden parish church in Woskowice Małe, Namysłów County in Poland.

The church was built in 1711. Restored between 1888 - 1889 and 1914 (during which time a polychrome by J. Langer was discovered). The shrine was renovated in 1969.

References

Kluczbork County
Woskowice Małe